Veena Sunder is an Indian actress who appears in Kannada films and soaps. For her performance in the movie Aa Karaala Ratri, she won Karnataka State Film Award for Best Supporting Actress in 2018.

Personal life
Veena married to actor Sundar. The couple have a daughter and son.

Career
Veena has appeared in more than 60 Kannada movies, playing mostly supporting roles.

Awards
2018 - Karnataka State Film Award for Best Supporting Actress - Aa Karaala Ratri
2018 - Filmfare Award - Best Actress in Supporting Role - Nominated - Kaafi Thota

Selected filmography
 Thothapuri (2021)
 Yuvarathnaa (2021)
 Asura Samhara (2020)
 Aa Karaala Ratri (2018)
 Kaafi Thota (2018)
 Puttakkana Highway (2018)
 Adhyaksha (2014)
 Olave Mandara (2011) - 
 Aptharakshaka (2010)
 Man of the Match (film)

See also

Karnataka State Film Award for Best Supporting Actress

References

External links

Actresses in Kannada cinema
Actresses in Kannada television
21st-century Indian actresses
Actresses from Karnataka
Year of birth missing (living people)
Living people
Actresses in Telugu cinema